Harry Kennedy may refer to:

 Harry Kennedy (politician) (born 1952), American politician in Missouri
 Harry Kennedy (songwriter) (1855–1894), ventriloquist and songwriter
 Harry S. Kennedy (1901–1986), bishop of Hawaii in the Episcopal Church
 Harry Kennedy, a fictional character played by Richard Armitage in The Vicar of Dibley
Henry Lamb Kennedy (died 1933), Fijian politician

See also
Henry Kennedy (disambiguation)
Harold Maurice Kennedy (1895–1971), U.S. federal judge